Werton de Almeida Rêgo (born 16 September 2003), simply known as Werton, is a Brazilian footballer who plays for Flamengo as a forward.

Club career
Born in Benjamin Constant, Amazonas, Werton joined Flamengo's youth setup in 2013, aged nine. On 22 December 2020, he signed his first professional contract, after agreeing to a deal until 2023.

Werton made his first team – and Série A – debut on 2 July 2021, coming on as a late substitute for Bruno Henrique in a 2–0 away win against Cuiabá.

Career statistics

References

2003 births
Living people
Sportspeople from Amazonas (Brazilian state)
Brazilian footballers
Association football forwards
Campeonato Brasileiro Série A players
CR Flamengo footballers